Q-ball is a hypothetical form of matter (namely, a non-topological soliton) in theoretical physics.

Q-ball or Q Ball may refer to:

 Q Ball, the nickname of the dynamic pressure (Q) sensor module in the Apollo spacecraft launch escape system
 Q-ball, a slang term for the drug quetiapine, especially when mixed with other drugs

See also 
 Cue ball, the ball struck with the cue stick in billiards, pool, snooker, and other cue sports
 Cueball Carmichael, American professional wrestler, trainer and promoter